Thure Johan Ahlqvist (20 April 1907 – 20 March 1983) was a Swedish lightweight boxer who won a silver medal at the 1932 Summer Olympics. A tall and mobile boxer, Ahlqvist favored fighting at a distance, occasionally throwing straight punches.

1932 Olympic results
Below are the results for Thure Ahlqvist, a Swedish lightweight boxer who competed at the 1932 Los Angeles Olympics:

 Round of 16: bye
 Quarterfinal: defeated Gaston Mayor (France) by decision
 Semifinal: defeated Nathan Bor (United States) by decision
 Final: lost to Lawrence Stevens (South Africa) by decision (was awarded silver medal)

References

1907 births
1983 deaths
Lightweight boxers
Olympic boxers of Sweden
Boxers at the 1932 Summer Olympics
Olympic silver medalists for Sweden
Olympic medalists in boxing
Medalists at the 1932 Summer Olympics
Swedish male boxers
People from Borås
Sportspeople from Västra Götaland County
20th-century Swedish people